Stemmatophora rungsi is a species of snout moth. It is found in Portugal.

The wingspan is about 21 mm.

References

Moths described in 2000
Pyralini
Moths of Europe